Cris Edward Dishman (born August 13, 1965) is an American football coach and former cornerback who is the defensive coordinator for the Vegas Vipers of the XFL. He played for the Houston Oilers, the Kansas City Chiefs, the Minnesota Vikings, and the Washington Redskins during his thirteen-year career from 1988 to 2000 in the National Football League.

Early career
Dishman attended St. Francis DeSales High School where he was two time Kentucky All-State in 1981 and 1982. Dishman played college football at Purdue University, where he was named to the All-Big Ten team in 1987. He also ran track for the Boilermakers, running the 200-meter dash and 400-meter dash. He graduated in 1988 with a degree in criminal justice. Dishman was selected in the 5th round with the 125th pick of the 1988 NFL Draft by the Houston Oilers. In Dishman's first season with the Oilers, he played 15 of the 16 games, and finished the season without an interception. However, Dishman did score a touchdown during a game against the Philadelphia Eagles, when Eugene Seale blocked a punt attempt and Dishman ran it into the end zone. During the 1989 season, he played all 16 games and racked up 4 interceptions. By the end of his first two seasons in the league, he also blocked two punts and a field goal, along with his special teams touchdown.

In 1990, with the addition of new head coach Jack Pardee, Dishman was moved to the starting left cornerback position, and finished the season with 4 interceptions. His best season as a pro came during the 1991 NFL season. During this season, Dishman had a seven-game stretch where he forced at least one turnover in each contest. The streak started in week 2 against the Cincinnati Bengals. On the opening drive, Dishman tackled tight end Rodney Hollman at the goal line, forcing a fumble on the Bengals' opening drive. The next time the Oilers faced the Bengals during week nine, Dishman picked off a Boomer Esiason pass to mark the seventh straight game in which he forced a turnover. He ended the season with six interceptions, three fumble recoveries (one of which he returned for a touchdown), and two forced fumbles. This led to him being selected for the 1992 Pro Bowl, his only Pro Bowl appearance. After the season, he began a holdout, which did not end until September 11, 1992, when he signed a two-year contract. Dishman's production for the 1992 season went down, as he only notched three interceptions for the season.

Dishman's 1993 season, however, started off very productively, with the help of new defensive coordinator Buddy Ryan. In the second game of the season against the Chiefs, Dishman had a 58-yard touchdown run after taking the ball from tight end Mike Dyal. He finished the 1993 season having tied a career-high with six interceptions, forced a career-high four fumbles, and managed an interception in four consecutive games. He notched four interceptions while returning one for a touchdown in 1994, and also managed three during the 1995 season. As a result of his efforts and his contract winding down, Dishman was selected as the franchise player for the 1996 season. In fact, the $2.5 million he made during the 1996 season was the second highest among cornerbacks behind Rod Woodson. However, Dishman finished the season with only one pick. After this performance and being frustrated by losses, as well as the move to Nashville, Dishman filed for free agency after the 1996 season.

Later career
After Dishman was granted free agency, the Washington Redskins became interested in signing him as an insurance policy should Tom Carter or Darrell Green sign elsewhere. Carter eventually signed with the Chicago Bears, and Cris Dishman was signed to a four-year contract, with the Oilers not making a counteroffer. He platooned with cornerback Darrell Green to become one of the better duos in the NFL. He finished the season with four interceptions, including bringing one back for a touchdown. As a result, he was named an alternate for the 1998 Pro Bowl, and was selected to the 1997 All-Madden team. However, after a disappointing 1998 season and subsequent release, he signed with the Kansas City Chiefs after an impressive workout, filling the void left by Dale Carter. His best game for the Chiefs came on November 28, 1999 against the Oakland Raiders. In this game, Dishman had two defensive touchdowns, one on an interception, and the other on a fumble. Despite five interceptions on the season, Dishman was released by the Chiefs. During the off-season, he signed with the Minnesota Vikings. After playing eleven games for the Vikings, he was cut, and subsequently retired.  His release came three weeks after he was embarrassed on Monday Night Football by an improbable Antonio Freeman touchdown catch during overtime.  Dishman raised his arms in victory believing he had broken up the pass, thus allowing Freeman to run untouched into the end zone.

After retiring, Dishman became a football coach. He started off by taking part in the NFL's Minority Coaching Fellowship program. During the 2006 Miami Dolphins season, Dishman spent training camp as a coach for the Dolphins, alongside Eric Green and Cornell Brown. Shortly afterward, Dishman became the defensive backs coach for Menlo College in 2006, and currently holds the position of defensive coordinator, which he was awarded on February 15, 2007. He spent the summer of 2007 again as part of the minority coaching fellowship, this time as a coach for the Oakland Raiders.

On January 21, 2009, Dishman was hired by the San Diego Chargers as an assistant defensive backs coach, helping out newly acquired secondary coach Steven Wilks.

On January 14, 2015 Dishman joined the Baylor University football staff coaching Safeties.

On May 20, 2018 Dishman joined the Montreal Alouettes as part of the Canadian Football League CFL to coach Defensive Backs.

On June 1, 2019, Dishman was named the defensive backs coach for the New York Guardians of the XFL.

On July 1, 2020, Dishman was named the defensive backs coach for IMG Academy in Bradenton, FL.

In March of 2022, Dishman was named the defensive coordinator and defensive backs coach for the New Jersey Generals of the USFL.

Dishman was officially hired by the Vegas Vipers on September 13, 2022

References

External links
Cris Dishman at JT-SW
Cris Dishman at Pro-football-reference
San Diego Chargers bio
DeSALES HIGH SCHOOL 50 YEAR FOOTBALL TEAMS

1965 births
Living people
Players of American football from Louisville, Kentucky
American football cornerbacks
Purdue Boilermakers football players
Houston Oilers players
Washington Redskins players
Kansas City Chiefs players
Minnesota Vikings players
Berlin Thunder coaches    
Menlo Oaks football coaches 
San Diego Chargers coaches 
Baylor Bears football coaches
Montreal Alouettes coaches
New York Guardians coaches
American Conference Pro Bowl players
Sportspeople from Louisville, Kentucky
New Jersey Generals (2022) coaches